Solo is a solo album by Brazilian composer, guitarist and pianist Egberto Gismonti recorded in 1978 and released on the ECM label.

Reception
The Allmusic review by Stephen Cook awarded the album 4 stars, stating, "Here, Gismonti is just fine as he takes flight without any companions, treating listeners to a provocative and often meditative solo program".

Track listing
All compositions by Egberto Gismonti except as indicated
 "Selva Amazonica/Pau Rolou" – 20:10 
 "Ano Zero" (Geraldo Carneiro, Gismonti) – 6:56 
 "Frevo" – 9:17 
 "Salvador" – 6:40 
 "Ciranda Nordestina" – 9:57 
Recorded at Talent Studio in Oslo, Norway in November 1978

Personnel
 Egberto Gismonti – 8-string guitar, piano, surdo, cooking bells voice

References

1979 albums
ECM Records albums
Albums produced by Manfred Eicher
Egberto Gismonti albums